Wally Smith may refer to:

Wally Smith (baseball) (1888–1930), MLB player
Wally Smith (footballer, born 1874) (1874–1958), English footballer with Lincoln, Brighton, Norwich and Southend in the 1900s
Wally Smith (footballer, born 1885) (1885 – after 1915), English footballer with Bury and Birmingham in the 1910s
Wally Fullerton Smith (born 1960), Australian rugby league player
Wally Smith, La Choy Chinese food co-founder
Wally Smith (mathematician) (born 1926), British-American mathematician

See also
 Walter Smith (disambiguation)
 Wallace Smith (disambiguation)